The 2022 Cleveland Guardians season was the 122nd season for the franchise. This was the team's first season as the Cleveland Guardians, following the franchise's name change in light of the Cleveland Indians name and logo controversy. The team opened their regular season on April 7, 2022, on the road against the Kansas City Royals, and finished the season on October 5 at home, also against the Royals.

On December 2, 2021, Commissioner of Baseball Rob Manfred announced a lockout of players, following expiration of the collective bargaining agreement (CBA) between the league and the Major League Baseball Players Association (MLBPA). On March 10, 2022, the MLB and MLBPA agreed to a new collective bargaining agreement, ending the lockout. Opening Day was played on April 7. Although MLB previously announced that several series would be cancelled due to the lockout, the agreement provides for a 162-game season, with originally canceled games to be made up via doubleheaders.

The Guardians won the American League Central title for the first time since 2018 and defeated the Tampa Bay Rays in the Wild Card Series, but were defeated by the New York Yankees in the Division Series in five games.

Offseason

Lockout 

The expiration of the league's collective bargaining agreement (CBA) with the Major League Baseball Players Association occurred on December 1, 2021 with no new agreement in place. As a result, the team owners voted unanimously to lockout the players stopping all free agency and trades.

The parties came to an agreement on a new CBA on March 10, 2022.

Rule changes 
Pursuant to the new CBA, several new rules were instituted for the 2022 season. The National League will adopt the designated hitter full-time, a draft lottery will be implemented, the postseason will expand from ten teams to twelve, and advertising patches will appear on player uniforms and helmets for the first time.

Roster

Summary
The Guardians signed third baseman  José Ramírez to a 5-year, $124 million extension with the Cleveland Guardians.  Combined with his contract extension signed in November 2021, Ramírez' new contract guaranteed nearly $150 million through 2028.  The largest contract awarded in franchise history, the deal also included a full "no-trade" clause.

In Cleveland's home opener, Ramírez doubled in the ninth inning of a 4–1 defeat to the San Francisco Giants for his 1,000th career hit.

Ramírez won American League (AL) Player of the Month honors for April, having hit .342 (27-for-79) and .722 slugging percentage, 12 runs scored, seven doubles, a triple, seven home runs, 28 RBI, and nine bases on balls over 21 games.  During that month, he also reached the career milestone of 1,000 games played.

On May 26, the Guardians recalled outfielder Oscar González to the major league roster.  He made his major league debut that same day, starting in right field versus the Detroit Tigers at Comerica Park.  He singled on a line drive to center field off starting pitcher Tarik Skubal in the top of the second his for the first hit.  In the ninth inning, he hit his first major league double.  

On May 28 versus Detroit, Ramírez homered, tripled and drove in five runs, amounting to an MLB-leading 48 RBI through the Guardians' first 42 games, tied for third-most in club history.  Of all in franchise history, only Manny Ramirez (56 in 1999), Al Rosen (49 in 1954) and Earl Averill (also 48) had equaled or surpassed José Ramírez.

Ramírez was named AL Player of the Week for the May 24–30, having recorded three home runs, three stolen bases, 11 RBI, seven total extra base hits, .348/.423/.957, three walks and one strikeout.

On June 10, versus the Oakland Athletics, González achieved his first major league four-hit game.

The Guardians clinched their 11th AL Central title, and first since 2018, on September 25 after beating the Texas Rangers, 10–4.

The Guardians set a franchise record with four Gold Glove award winners: Shane Bieber, Andrés Giménez, Steven Kwan, and Myles Straw.

Manager Terry Francona was named American League Manager of the Year.

President of Baseball Operations Chris Antonetti won the MLB Executive of the Year Award.

Season standings

American League Central

American League Wild Card

Record against opponents

Game log

Regular season

|- style="background:#fbb 
| 1 || April 7 || @ Royals || 1–3 || Barlow (1–0) || McKenzie (0–1) || — || 28,459 || 0–1 || L1 
|- style="background:#fbb;"
| 2 || April 9 || @ Royals || 0–1  || Snider (1–0) || Clase (0–1) || — || 17,103 || 0–2 || L2
|- style="background:#bfb;" 
| 3 || April 10 || @ Royals || 17–3 || Quantrill (1–0) || Bubic (0–1) || — || 20,165 || 1–2 || W1
|- style="background:#bfb;" 
| 4 || April 11 || @ Royals || 10–7 || Allen (1–0) || Brentz (0–1) || — || 8,971 || 2–2 || W2
|- style="background:#bfb;" 
| 5 || April 12 || @ Reds || 10–5 || Stephan (1–0) || Strickland (0–1) || — || 43,036 || 3–2 || W3
|- style="background:#bfb;" 
| 6 || April 13 || @ Reds || 7–3 || Morgan (1–0) || Lodolo (0–1) || — || 10,976 || 4–2 || W4
|- style="background:#fbb
| 7 || April 15 || Giants || 1–4 || Rodón (1-0) || Plesac (0-1) || Doval (2) || 33,469 || 4–3 || L1
|- style="background:#fbb
| 8 || April 16 || Giants || 2–4 || Leone (1-0) || Sandlin (0-1) || McGee (1) || 13,187 || 4–4 || L2
|- style="background:#fbb;" 
| 9 || April 17 || Giants || 1–8 || Wood (1–0) || Civale (0–1) || — || 9,620 || 4–5 || L3
|- style="background:#bbb;" 
| — || April 18 || White Sox || colspan=7 | Postponed (inclement weather); Makeup July 12
|- style="background:#bbb;" 
| — || April 19 || White Sox || colspan=7 | Postponed (inclement weather); Makeup April 20
|- style="background:#bfb;" 
| 10 || April 20  || White Sox || 11–1 || Bieber (1–0) || Keuchel (1–1) || — ||  || 5–5 || W1
|- style="background:#bfb;"
| 11 || April 20  || White Sox || 2–1 || Gose (1–0) || Lambert (0–2) || Clase (1) || 9,196 || 6–5 || W2
|- style="background:#bfb;" 
| 12 || April 21 || White Sox || 6–3 || Plesac (1–1) || Cease (2–1) || Clase (2) || 8,345 || 7–5 || W3
|- style="background:#fbb;" 
| 13 || April 22 || @ Yankees || 1–4 || Taillon (1–1) || Morgan (1–1) || Chapman (4) || 41,062 || 7–6 || L1
|- style="background:#fbb;" 
| 14 || April 23 || @ Yankees || 4–5 || Castro (1–0) || Clase (0–2) || — || 39,180 || 7–7 || L2
|- style="background:#fbb;" 
| 15 || April 24 || @ Yankees || 2–10 || Cole (1–0) || Civale (0–2) || — || 39,050 || 7–8 || L3
|- style="background:#fbb;" 
| 16 || April 25 || @ Angels || 0–3 || Lorenzen (2–1) || Bieber (1–1) || Iglesias (3) || 23,099 || 7–9 || L4
|- style="background:#fbb;" 
| 17 || April 26 || @ Angels || 1–4 || Sandoval (1–0) || McKenzie (0–2) || Iglesias (4) || 22,551 || 7–10 || L5
|- style="background:#fbb;" 
| 18 || April 27 || @ Angels || 5–9 || Ohtani (2–2) || Plesac (1–2) || — || 28,557 || 7–11 || L6
|- style="background:#fbb;" 
| 19 || April 28 || @ Angels || 1–4 || Detmers (1–1) || Quantrill (1–1) || Iglesias (5) || 18,826 || 7–12 || L7
|- style="background:#bfb;" 
| 20 || April 29 || @ Athletics || 9–8 || Stephan (2–0) || Acevedo (0–1) || Clase (3) || 12,910 || 8–12 || W1
|- style="background:#bfb;"
| 21 || April 30 || @ Athletics || 3–1 || Sandlin (1–1) || Jiménez (1–1) || Clase (4) || 6,707 || 9–12 || W2
|-

|- style="background:#bfb;"
| 22 || May 1 || @ Athletics || 7–3 || McKenzie (1–2) || Kaprielian (0–1) || — || 14,945 || 10–12 || W3
|- style="background:#bbb;" 
| — || May 3 || Padres || colspan=7 | Postponed (inclement weather); Makeup May 4
|- style="background:#fbb;" 
| 23 || May 4  || Padres || 4–5 || Crismatt (1–0) || Plesac (1–3) || Rogers (10) ||  || 10–13 || L1
|- style="background:#bfb;"
| 24 || May 4  || Padres || 6–5  || Sandlin (2–1) || Lamet (0–1) || — || 10,244 || 11–13 || W1 
|- style="background:#bfb;"
| 25 || May 5 || Blue Jays || 6–5 || Civale (1–2) || Berríos (2–1) || Clase (5) || 9,104 || 12–13 || W2
|- style="background:#bbb;" 
| — || May 6 || Blue Jays || colspan=7 | Postponed (inclement weather); Makeup May 7
|- style="background:#fbb;" 
| 26 || May 7  || Blue Jays || 3–8 || Gausman (3–1) || Bieber (1–2) || — ||  || 12–14 || L1
|- style="background:#bfb;" 
| 27 || May 7  || Blue Jays || 8–2 || McKenzie (2–2) || Stripling (0–1) || — || 16,819 || 13–14 || W1
|- style="background:#bfb;"
| 28 || May 8 || Blue Jays || 4–3 || Shaw (1–0) || Cimber (4–2) || Clase (6) || 14,787 || 14–14 || W2
|- style="background:#bfb;"
| 29 || May 9 || @ White Sox || 12–9  || Clase (1–2) || Burr (0–1) || Stephan (1) || 17,168 || 15–14 || W3  
|- style="background:#fbb;" 
| 30 || May 10 || @ White Sox || 1–4 || Giolito (2–1) || Quantrill (1–2) || Graveman (2) || 16,025 || 15–15 || L1
|- style="background:#bbb;" 
| — || May 11 || @ White Sox || colspan=7 | Postponed (COVID-19); Makeup July 23
|- style="background:#fbb;"
| 31 || May 13 || @ Twins || 8–12 || Jax (3–0) || Civale (1–3) || — || 18,711 || 15–16 || L2
|- style="background:#bfb;"
| 32 || May 14 || @ Twins || 3–2  || Sandlin (3–1) || Cotton (0–1) || Clase (7) || 22,939 || 16–16 || W1
|- style="background:#fbb;" 
| 33 || May 15 || @ Twins || 1–3 || Ryan (4–2) || McKenzie (2–3) || Pagán (5) || 19,850 || 16–17 || L1
|- style="background:#fbb
| 34 || May 17 || Reds || 4–5  || Warren (2-1) || Sandlin (3-2) || Díaz (1) || 12,916 || 16-18 || L2
|- style="background:#bbb;" 
| — || May 18 || Reds || colspan=7 | Postponed (inclement weather); Makeup May 19
|- style="background:#fbb;" 
| 35 || May 19 || Reds || 2–4 || Cessa (2–0) || Stephan (2–1) || Santillan (2) || 8,510 || 16–19 || L3
|- style="background:#bfb;" 
| 36 || May 20 || Tigers || 6–1 || Civale (2–3) || Barnes (3–1) || — || 23,874 || 17–19 || W1
|- style="background:#bbb;" 
| — || May 21 || Tigers || colspan=7 | Postponed (inclement weather); Makeup July 14
|- style="background:#fbb;" 
| 37 || May 22 || Tigers || 2–4 || Faedo (1–1) || Bieber (1–3) || Soto (7) || 15,554 || 17–20 || L1
|- style="background:#bfb;"
| 38 || May 23 || @ Astros || 6–1 || McKenzie (3–3) || García (3–3) || — || 28,284 || 18–20 || W1
|- style="background:#fbb;" 
| 39 || May 24 || @ Astros || 3–7 || Valdez (4–2) || Plesac (1–4) || — || 26,621 || 18–21 || L1
|- style="background:#fbb;" 
| 40 || May 25 || @ Astros || 1–2 || Javier (3–2) || Quantrill (1–3) || Pressly (7) || 25,412 || 18–22 || L2
|- style="background:#fbb;"
| 41 || May 26 || @ Tigers || 3–4 || Soto (2–2) || Stephan (2–2) || — || 12,764 || 18–23 || L3
|- style="background:#bbb;" 
| — || May 27 || @ Tigers || colspan=7 | Postponed (inclement weather); Makeup July 4
|- style="background:#bfb;" 
| 42 || May 28 || @ Tigers || 8–1 || Bieber (2–3) || Faedo (1–2) || — || 26,134 || 19–23 || W1
|- style="background:#fbb;" 
| 43 || May 29 || @ Tigers || 1–2 || Lange (2–1) || McKenzie (3–4) || Soto (8) || 19,990 || 19–24 || L1
|- style="background:#bfb;" 
| 44 || May 30 || Royals || 7–3 || Sandlin (4–2) || Snider (3–2) || — || 15,271 || 20–24 || W1
|- style="background:#bfb;" 
| 45 || May 31 || Royals || 8–3 || Quantrill (2–3) || Lynch (2–4) || — || 10,519 || 21–24 || W2
|-

|- style="background:#bfb;" 
| 46 || June 1 || Royals || 4–0 || Pilkington (1–0) || Keller (1–6) || — || 12,895 || 22–24 || W3
|- style="background:#bfb;" 
| 47 || June 3 || @ Orioles || 6–3 || Bieber (3–3) || Zimmermann (2–4) || Clase (8) || 15,456 || 23–24 || W4
|- style="background:#fbb;"
| 48 || June 4 || @ Orioles || 4–5 || Bautista (2–1) || McKenzie (3–5) || López (7) || 17,183 || 23–25 || L1
|- style="background:#bfb;" 
| 49 || June 5 || @ Orioles || 3–2 || Plesac (2–4) || Kremer (0–1) || Clase (9) || 14,815 || 24–25 || W1 
|- style="background:#bbb;" 
| — || June 6 || Rangers || colspan=7 | Postponed (inclement weather); Makeup June 7
|- style="background:#bfb;" 
| 50 || June 7  || Rangers || 6–3 || Quantrill (3–3) || Gray (1–3) || Clase (10) ||  || 25–25 || W2
|- style="background:#fbb;" 
| 51 || June 7  || Rangers || 3–6 || Hearn (4–4) || McCarty (0–1) || Barlow (11) || 10,763 || 25–26 || L1
|- style="background:#bfb;"
| 52 || June 8 || Rangers || 4–0 || Morgan (2–1) || Dunning (1–4) || — || 10,965 || 26–26 || W1
|- style="background:#bfb;" 
| 53 || June 9 || Athletics || 8–4 || De Los Santos (1–0) || Trivino (1–5) || — || 12,995 || 27–26 || W2
|- style="background:#bfb;"
| 54 || June 10 || Athletics || 3–2 || Gose (2–0) || Jiménez (2–4) || — || 21,311 || 28–26 || W3
|- style="background:#fbb;"
| 55 || June 11 || Athletics || 5–10 || Montas (3–6) || Morgan (2–2) || — || 22,674 || 28–27 || L1
|- style="background:#bfb;" 
| 56 || June 12 || Athletics || 6–3 || Quantrill (4–3) || Irvin (2–3) || Clase (11) || 17,775 || 29–27 || W1
|- style="background:#bfb;"
| 57 || June 14 || @ Rockies || 4–3  || Shaw (2–0) || Stephenson (0–1) || Clase (12) || 28,377 || 30–27 || W2
|- style="background:#bfb;" 
| 58 || June 15 || @ Rockies || 7–5 || Shaw (3–0) || Gomber (3–7) || Clase (13) || 23,838 || 31–27 || W3
|- style="background:#bfb;" 
| 59 || June 16 || @ Rockies || 4–2 || McKenzie (4–5) || Kuhl (4–4) || Clase (14) || 26,629 || 32–27 || W4
|- style="background:#bfb;" 
| 60 || June 17 || @ Dodgers || 2–1  || Gose (3–0) || Phillips (1–3) || De Los Santos (1) || 48,361 || 33–27 || W5
|- style="background:#fbb;" 
| 61 || June 18 || @ Dodgers || 1–7 || Urías (4–6) || Quantrill (4–4) || — || 50,078 || 33–28 || L1
|- style="background:#bfb;"
| 62 || June 19 || @ Dodgers || 5–3 || Morgan (3–2) || Kimbrel (0–3) || Clase (15) || 53,033 || 34–28 || W1
|- style="background:#bfb;"
| 63 || June 21 || @ Twins || 6–5  || Stephan (3–2) || Jax (4–1) || Clase (16) || 22,341 || 35–28 || W2
|- style="background:#bfb;"
| 64 || June 22 || @ Twins || 11–10 || Hentges (1–0) || Jax (4–2) || Clase (17) || 25,604 || 36–28 || W3
|- style="background:#fbb;" 
| 65 || June 23 || @ Twins || 0–1 || Smeltzer (4–1) || Plesac (2–5) || Thielbar (1) || 24,929 || 36–29 || L1
|- style="background:#fbb;"
| 66 || June 24 || Red Sox || 3–6 || Pivetta (8–5) || Shaw (3–1) || — || 29,106 || 36–30 || L2
|- style="background:#fbb;"
| 67 || June 25 || Red Sox || 2–4 || Winckowski (3–1) || Bieber (3–4) || Houck (6) || 27,239 || 36–31 || L3
|- style="background:#fbb;"
| 68 || June 26 || Red Sox || 3–8 || Hill (4–4) || Civale (2–4) || — || 20,663 || 36–32 || L4
|- style="background:#fbb;"
| 69 || June 27 || Twins || 1–11 || Gray (4–1) || McKenzie (4–6) || — || 12,554 || 36–33 || L5
|- style="background:#bfb;" 
| 70 || June 28  || Twins || 3–2 || Hentges (2–0) || Pagán (1–3) || Clase (18) || 12,442 || 37–33 || W1
|- style="background:#fbb;"
| 71 || June 28  || Twins || 0–6 || Winder (3–2) || Pilkington (1–1) || — || 12,145 || 37–34 || L1
|- style="background:#bfb;" 
| 72 || June 29 || Twins || 7–6  || Morgan (4–2) || Cotton (2–2) || — || 12,840 || 38–34 || W1
|- style="background:#bfb;" 
| 73 || June 30 || Twins || 5–3 || Clase (2–2) || Thornburg (0–1) || — || 17,066 || 39–34 || W2
|-

|- style="background:#bbb;" 
| — || July 1 || Yankees || colspan=7 | Postponed (inclement weather); Makeup July 2
|- style="background:#fbb;"
| 74 || July 2  || Yankees || 4–13 || Cole (7–2) || McCarty (0–2) || — || 21,203 || 39–35 || L1
|- style="background:#fbb;"  
| 75 || July 2  || Yankees || 1–6 || Cortés Jr. (7–3) || Civale (2–5) || Holmes (15) || 29,236 || 39–36 || L2
|- style="background:#bfb;" 
| 76 || July 3 || Yankees || 2–0 || McKenzie (5–6) || Montgomery (3–2) || Clase (19) || 26,113 || 40–36 || W1
|- style="background:#fbb;"
| 77 || July 4  || @ Tigers || 1–4 || Hill (1–0) || Plesac (2–6) || Soto (16) || 19,737 || 40–37 || L1
|- style="background:#fbb;" 
| 78 || July 4  || @ Tigers || 3–5 || Alexander (2–3) || Stephan (3–3) || Jiménez (1) || 24,395 || 40–38 || L2
|- style="background:#fbb;" 
| 79 || July 5 || @ Tigers || 4–11 || Hutchison (1–4) || Quantrill (4–5) || — || 16,662 || 40–39 || L3
|- style="background:#fbb;" 
| 80 || July 6 || @ Tigers || 2–8 || Pineda (2–3) || Bieber (3–5) || — || 17,829 || 40–40 || L4
|- style="background:#fbb;"
| 81 || July 8 || @ Royals || 3–4 || Barlow (3–2) || Hentges (2–1) || — || 19,611 || 40–41 || L5
|- style="background:#bfb;"
| 82 || July 9 || @ Royals || 13–1 || McKenzie (6–6) || Heasley (1–5) || — || 17,024 || 41–41 || W1
|- style="background:#fbb;" 
| 83 || July 10 || @ Royals || 1–5 || Greinke (3–5) || Plesac (2–7) || — || 13,284 || 41–42 || L1
|- style="background:#bfb;"
| 84 || July 11 || White Sox || 8–4 || Quantrill (5–5) || Lynn (1–2) || — || 13,655 || 42–42 || W1
|- style="background:#bfb;" 
| 85 || July 12  || White Sox || 4–1 || Bieber (4–5) || Martin (1–3) || — || 11,342 || 43–42 || W2
|- style="background:#fbb;"
| 86 || July 12  || White Sox || 0–7 || Cease (8–4) || Pilkington (1–2) || — || 11,750 || 43–43 || L1
|- style="background:#fbb;"
| 87 || July 13 || White Sox || 1–2 || Giolito (6–5) || Hentges (2–2) || Hendriks (18) || 13,987 || 43–44 || L2
|- style="background:#bfb;"
| 88 || July 14 || Tigers || 4–0 || McKenzie (7–6) || Rodríguez (0–4) || — || 14,327 || 44–44 || W1
|- style="background:#bfb;"
| 89 || July 15 || Tigers || 6–5 || Shaw (4–1) || Fulmer (2–4) || Stephan (2) || 27,846 || 45–44 || W2
|- style="background:#bfb;" 
| 90 || July 16 || Tigers || 10–0 || Quantrill (6–5) || Pineda (2–5) || — || 26,789 || 46–44 || W3
|- style="background:#bbb;"
| -- || July 17 || Tigers || colspan=7 | Postponed (inclement weather); Makeup August 15
|- style="text-align:center; background:#bbcaff;"
| colspan="12" | 92nd All-Star Game: Los Angeles, CA
|- style="background:#bfb;"
| 91 || July 22 || @ White Sox || 8–2 || Quantrill (7–5) || Giolito (6–6) || — || 31,379 || 47–44 || W4
|- style="background:#bfb;"
| 92 || July 23  || @ White Sox || 7–4 || Stephan (4–3) || Hendriks (1–3) || Clase (20) || 18,518 || 48–44 || W5
|- style="background:#fbb;"
| 93 || July 23  || @ White Sox || 4–5 || Kelly (1–2) || Shaw (4–2) || Foster (1) || 26,329 || 48–45 || L1
|- style="background:#fbb;"
| 94 || July 24 || @ White Sox || 3–6 || Cease (10–4) || Bieber (4–6) || — || 30,831 || 48–46 || L2
|- style="background:#fbb;" 
| 95 || July 25 || @ Red Sox || 1–3 || Schreiber (3–1) || Plesac (2–8) || Whitlock (2) || 32,529 || 48–47 || L3
|- style="background:#bfb;" 
| 96 || July 26 || @ Red Sox || 8–3 || McCarty (1–2) || Winckowski (3–5) || — || 32,483 || 49–47 || W1
|- style="background:#bfb;"
| 97 || July 27 || @ Red Sox || 7–6 || De Los Santos (2–0) || Houck (5–4)|| Clase (21) || 32,919 ||50–47 || W2
|- style="background:#fbb;"
| 98 || July 28 || @ Red Sox || 2–4 || Diekman (5–1) || McKenzie (7–7) || Whitlock (3) || 32,122 || 50–48 || L1
|- style="background:#bfb;"
| 99 || July 29 || @ Rays || 4–1 || Bieber (5–6) || Springs (3–3) || Clase (22) || 14,671 || 51–48 || W1
|- style="background:#fbb;"
| 100 || July 30 || @ Rays || 4–6 || Kluber (7–6) ||  Plesac (2–9) || Fairbanks (2) || 22,756 || 51–49 || L1
|- style="background:#bfb;"
| 101 || July 31 || @ Rays || 5–3 || McCarty (2–2) || McClanahan (10–4) || Clase (23) || 18,023 || 52–49 || W1
|-

|- style="background:#bfb;" 
| 102 || August 1 || Diamondbacks || 6–5  || Hentges (3–2) || Melancon (3–10) || — || 13,707 || 53–49 || W2
|- style="background:#fbb;"
| 103 || August 2 || Diamondbacks || 3–6 || Gallen (6–2) || McKenzie (7–8) || Kennedy (5) || 14,471 || 53–50 || L1
|- style="background:#bfb;"
| 104 || August 3 || Diamondbacks || 7–4 || Bieber (6–6) || Henry (0–1) || — || 18,642 || 54–50 || W1
|- style="background:#fbb;" 
| 105 || August 4 || Astros || 0–6 || Verlander (15–3) || Plesac (2–10) || — || 16,808 || 54–51 || L1
|- style="background:#fbb;"
| 106 || August 5 || Astros || 3–9 || Valdez (10–4) || Gaddis (0–1) || — || 24,712 || 54–52 || L2
|- style="background:#bfb;"
| 107 || August 6 || Astros || 4–1 || Quantrill (8–5) || García (8–8) || — || 25,327 || 55–52 || W1
|- style="background:#bfb;"
| 108 || August 7 || Astros || 1–0 || McKenzie (8–8) || Javier (6–8) || Clase (24) || 22,688 || 56–52 || W2
|- style="background:#bfb;"
| 109 || August 9 || @ Tigers || 5–2 || Bieber (7–6) || Alexander (2–6) || Clase (25) || 16,359 || 57–52 || W3
|- style="background:#bfb;"
| 110 || August 10 || @ Tigers || 3–2 || Shaw (5–2) || Hutchison (1–6) || Clase (26) || 16,560 || 58–52 || W4
|- style="background:#bfb;"
| 111 || August 11 || @ Tigers || 4–3  || De Los Santos (3–0) || Soto (2–7) || Shaw (1) || 19,036 || 59–52 || W5
|- style="background:#bfb;"
| 112 || August 12 || @ Blue Jays || 8–0 || Quantrill (9–5) || Berríos (8–5) || — || 41,677 || 60–52 || W6
|- style="background:#fbb;" 
| 113 || August 13 || @ Blue Jays || 1–2 || Bass (3–3) || McKenzie (8–9) || Romano (26) || 44,977 || 60–53 || L1
|- style="background:#bfb;"
| 114 || August 14 || @ Blue Jays || 7–2 || Bieber (8–6) || Gausman (8–9) || — || 41,002 || 61–53 || W1
|- style="background:#bfb;"
| 115 || August 15  || Tigers || 4–1 || Karinchak (1–0) || Vest (3–3) || Clase (27) ||  || 62–53 || W2
|- style="background:#fbb;"
| 116 || August 15  || Tigers || 5–7 || Garcia (1–0) || Morgan (4–3) || Soto (21) || 16,980 || 62–54 || L1
|- style="background:#fbb;"
| 117 || August 16 || Tigers || 3–4 || Hill (3–3) || Plesac (2–11) || Soto (22) || 13,503 || 62–55 || L2
|- style="background:#bfb;"
| 118 || August 17 || Tigers || 8–4 || Shaw (6–2) || Chafin (0–2) || — || 14,335 || 63–55 || W1
|- style="background:#bfb;"
| 119 || August 19 || White Sox || 5-2 || McKenzie (9-9) || Lopez (5-3) || Clase (28) || 25,521 || 64-55 || W2
|- style="background:#fbb;"
| 120 || August 20 || White Sox || 0–2 || Cueto (6–5) || Bieber (8–7) || Hendriks (28) || 26,179 || 64–56 || L1
|- style="background:#bbb;"
| — || August 21 || White Sox || colspan=7 | Postponed (inclement weather); Makeup September 15
|- style="background:#bfb;"
| 121 || August 23 || @ Padres || 3–1 || Sandlin (5–2) || Clevinger (4–5) || Clase (29) || 38,166 || 65–56 || W1
|- style="background:#bfb;"
| 122 || August 24 || @ Padres || 7–0 || Quantrill (10–5) || Snell (5–7) || — || 30,409 || 66–56 || W2
|- style="background:#fbb;"
| 123 || August 25 || @ Mariners || 1–3 || Gonzales (9–12) || McKenzie (9–10) || Muñoz (3) || 24,028 || 66–57 || L1
|- style="background:#fbb
| 124 || August 26 || @ Mariners || 2–3  || Murfee (4–0) || Clase (2–3) || — || 39,870 || 66–58 || L2
|- style="background:#bfb;"
| 125 || August 27 || @ Mariners || 4–3 || Plesac (3–11) || Muñoz (2–5) || Clase (30) || 45,586 || 67–58 || W1
|- style="background:#fbb;"
| 126 || August 28 || @ Mariners || 0–4 || Ray (11–8) || Civale (2–6) || — || 45,190 || 67–59 || L1
|- style="background:#bfb;"
| 127 || August 30 || Orioles || 5–1 || Quantrill (11–5) || Watkins (4–5) || — || 12,492 || 68–59 || W1
|- style="background:#fbb;"
| 128 || August 31 || Orioles || 0–4 || Lyles (10–9) || McKenzie (9–11) || — || 12,221 || 68–60 || L1
|-

|- style="background:#fbb;"
| 129 || September 1 || Orioles || 0–3 || Bradish (3–5) || Bieber (8–8) || Bautista (11) || 11,827 || 68–61 || L2
|- style="background:#fbb;"
| 130 || September 2 || Mariners || 1–6 || Castillo (6–5) || Morris (0–1) || — || 21,923 || 68–62 || L3
|- style="background:#fbb;"
| 131 || September 3 || Mariners || 0–4 || Ray (12–8) || Curry (0–1) || — || 26,254 || 68–63 || L4
|- style="background:#fbb;"
| 132 || September 4 || Mariners || 3–6  || Boyd (1–0) || Stephan (4–4) || Flexen (2) || 17,809 || 68–64 || L5
|- style="background:#bfb;"
| 133 || September 5 || @ Royals || 6–5  || Morgan (5–3) || Hernández (0–5) || Clase (31) || 11,511 || 69–64 || W1
|- style="background:#bfb;"
| 134 || September 6 || @ Royals || 4–1 || Bieber (9–8) || Bubic (2–11) || Karinchak (1) || 12,580 || 70–64 || W2
|- style="background:#fbb;"
| 135 || September 7 || @ Royals || 1–2 || Barlow (6–4) || Clase (2–4) || — || 13,394 || 70–65 || L1
|- style="background:#bfb;"
| 136 || September 9 || @ Twins || 7–6 || Quantrill (12–5) || Bundy (8–7) || Clase (32) || 18,595 || 71–65 || W1
|- style="background:#bfb;"
| 137 || September 10 || @ Twins || 6–4 || McKenzie (10–11) || Archer (2–8) || Clase (33) || 26,073 || 72–65 || W2
|- style="background:#bfb;"
| 138 || September 11 || @ Twins || 4–1 || Bieber (10–8) || Winder (4–4) || Karinchak (2) || 19,016 || 73–65 || W3
|- style="background:#bfb;"
| 139 || September 12 || Angels || 5–4 || De Los Santos (4–0) || Loup (0–5) || Clase (34) || 12,461 || 74–65 || W4
|- style="background:#bfb;"
| 140 || September 13 || Angels || 3–1 || McCarty (3–2) || Suárez (6–7) || Clase (35) || 14,419 || 75–65 || W5
|- style="background:#bfb;" 
| 141 || September 14 || Angels || 5–3 || Stephan (5–4) || Tepera (4–3) || Karinchak (3) || 14,529 || 76–65 || W6
|- style="background:#fbb;" 
| 142 || September 15 || White Sox || 2–8 || Lynn (7–5) || Gaddis (0–2) || — || 11,186 || 76–66 || L1
|- style="background:#bfb;" 
| 143 || September 16 || Twins || 4–3 || Stephan (6–4) || Durán (2–4) || Clase (36) || 20,669 || 77–66 || W1
|- style="background:#bfb;" 
| 144 || September 17  || Twins || 5–1 || Bieber (11−8) || Varland (0−1) || — || 18,177 || 78–66 || W2
|- style="background:#bfb;" 
| 145 || September 17  || Twins || 7–6  || McCarty (4–2) || Rodríguez (0–1) || — || 24,449 || 79–66 || W3
|- style="background:#fbb;"
| 146 || September 18 || Twins || 0–3 || Ryan (12–8) || Morris (0–2) || Durán (8) || 19,601 || 79–67 || L1
|- style="background:#bfb;" 
| 147 || September 19 || Twins || 11–4 || Quantrill (13–5) || Gray (8–5) || Hentges (1) || 12,168 || 80–67 || W1
|- style="background:#bfb;" 
| 148 || September 20 || @ White Sox || 10–7  || Clase (3–4) || Diekman (5–4) || — || 23,242 || 81–67 || W2
|- style="background:#bfb;"
| 149 || September 21 || @ White Sox || 8–2 || McKenzie (11–11) || Lynn (7–6) || — || 22,606 || 82–67 || W3
|- style="background:#bfb;"
| 150 || September 22 || @ White Sox || 4–2 || Bieber (12–8) || Cueto (7–9) || Clase (37) || 23,395 || 83–67 || W4
|- style="background:#bfb;"
| 151 || September 23 || @ Rangers || 6–3 || Morris (1–2) || Hearn (6–8) || Clase (38) || 34,862 || 84–67 || W5
|- style="background:#bfb;"
| 152 || September 24 || @ Rangers || 4–2 || Quantrill (14–5) || Burke (7–4) || Clase (39) || 28,415 || 85–67 || W6
|- style="background:#bfb;"
| 153 || September 25 || @ Rangers || 10–4 || Civale (3–6) || Ragans (0–3) || — || 31,845 || 86–67 || W7
|- style="background:#fbb";
| 154 || September 27 || Rays || 5–6  || Guerra (2–0) || Stephan (6–5) || Faucher (1) || 10,775 || 86–68 || L1
|- style="background:#bfb;" 
| 155 || September 28 || Rays || 2–1  || Karinchak (2–0) || Guerra (2–1) || — || 10,674 || 87–68 || W1
|- style="background:#bfb;"
| 156 || September 29 || Rays || 2–1 || De Los Santos (5–0) || Armstrong (2–3) || Stephan (3) || 11,783 || 88–68 || W2
|- style="background:#bfb;"
| 157 || September 30 || Royals || 6–3 || Civale (4–6) || Singer (10–5) || Clase (40) || 19,763 || 89–68 || W3
|-

|- style="background:#fbb;"
| 158 || October 1 || Royals || 1–7 || Bubic (3–13) || Plesac (3–12) || — || 26,982 || 89–69 || L1
|- style="background:#bfb;"
| 159 || October 2 || Royals || 7–5 || Bieber (13–8) ||  Castillo (0–2) || Clase (41) || 20,622 || 90–69 || W1
|- style="background:#fbb;"
| 160 || October 3 || Royals || 2–5  || Barlow (7–4) || McCarty (4–3) || Clarke (3) || 18,688 || 90–70 || L1
|- style="background:#bfb;"
| 161 || October 4 || Royals || 5–3 || Quantrill (15–5) || Lynch (4–13) || Clase (42) || 19,455 || 91–70 || W1
|- style="background:#bfb;"
| 162 || October 5 || Royals || 9–2 || Civale (5–6) || Heasley (4–10) || — || 12,983 || 92–70 || W2
|-

|- style="text-align:center;"
| Legend:       = Win       = Loss       = PostponementBold = Guardians team member

Postseason

Game log

|-style="background:#bfb;"
| 1 || October 7 || Rays || 2–1 || Bieber (1–0) || McClanahan (0–1) || Clase (1) || 30,741 || 1–0
|-style="background:#bfb;"
| 2 || October 8 || Rays || 1–0  || Hentges (1–0) || Kluber (0–1) || — || 34,971 || 2–0
|-

|-style="background:#fbb;"
| 1 || October 11 || @ Yankees || 1−4 || Cole (1−0) || Quantrill (0−1) || — || 47,807 || 0−1
|-style="background:#bbb;" 
| — || October 13 || @ Yankees || colspan=7| Postponed (rain); Makeup October 14
|-style="background:#bfb;" 
| 2 || October 14 || @ Yankees || 4–2  || Clase (1–0) || Taillon (0–1) || — || 47,535 || 1–1
|-style="background:#bfb;"
| 3 || October 15 || Yankees || 6–5 || Morgan (1–0) || Schmidt (0–1) || — || 36,483 || 2–1
|-style="background:#fbb;"
| 4 || October 16 || Yankees || 2–4 || Cole (2–0) || Quantrill (0–2) || Peralta (1) || 36,728 || 2–2
|-style="background:#bbb;" 
| — || October 17 || @ Yankees || colspan=7| Postponed (rain); Makeup October 18
|-style="background:#fbb;"
| 5 || October 18 || @ Yankees || 1–5 || Cortés Jr. (1–0) || Civale (0–1) || — || 48,178 || 2–3
|- 

|- style="text-align:center;"
| Legend:       = Win       = Loss       = PostponementBold = Guardians team member

Postseason rosters

| style="text-align:left" |
Pitchers: 24 Triston McKenzie 31 Sam Hentges 34 Zach Plesac 37 Trevor Stephan 47 Cal Quantrill 48 Emmanuel Clase 49 Eli Morgan 52 Nick Sandlin 57 Shane Bieber 59 Kirk McCarty 62 Enyel De Los Santos 99 James Karinchak 
Catchers: 12 Luke Maile 17 Austin Hedges 44 Bo Naylor 
Infielders: 0 Andrés Giménez 1 Amed Rosario 6 Owen Miller 8 Gabriel Arias 11 José Ramírez 22 Josh Naylor 
Outfielders: 7 Myles Straw 29 Will Benson 38 Steven Kwan 39 Oscar González 63 Will Brennan
|- valign="top"

| style="text-align:left" |
Pitchers: 24 Triston McKenzie 31 Sam Hentges 34 Zach Plesac 36 Cody Morris 37 Trevor Stephan 43 Aaron Civale 47 Cal Quantrill 48 Emmanuel Clase 49 Eli Morgan 57 Shane Bieber 62 Enyel De Los Santos 99 James Karinchak 
Catchers: 12 Luke Maile 17 Austin Hedges 44 Bo Naylor 
Infielders: 0 Andrés Giménez 1 Amed Rosario 6 Owen Miller 8 Gabriel Arias 11 José Ramírez 22 Josh Naylor 
Outfielders: 7 Myles Straw 29 Will Benson 38 Steven Kwan 39 Oscar González 63 Will Brennan
|- valign="top"

Player stats

Batting
Note: G = Games played; AB = At bats; R = Runs scored; H = Hits; 2B = Doubles; 3B = Triples; HR = Home runs; RBI = Runs batted in; AVG = Batting average; SB = Stolen bases

Pitching
Note: W = Wins; L = Losses; ERA = Earned run average; G = Games pitched; GS = Games started; SV = Saves; IP = Innings pitched; H = Hits allowed; R = Runs allowed; ER = Earned runs allowed; BB = Walks allowed; K = Strikeouts

Postseason Stats

Batting

Pitching

Farm system

References

External links
 Cleveland Guardians 2022 Schedule at MLB.com
 Cleveland Guardians 2022 at Baseball Reference

Cleveland Guardians
Cleveland Guardians
Cleveland Guardians seasons
American League Central champion seasons